Exchange Square is a building complex located in Central, Hong Kong. It houses offices and the Hong Kong Stock Exchange. It is served by the Central and Hong Kong stations of the MTR metro system.

Most part of the Exchange Square is owned by Hong Kong Land, with the remaining portion owned by the Government. The building has three blocks, namely, One Exchange Square, Two Exchange Square and Three Exchange Square. A shopping block known as The Forum was redeveloped as an office building in 2011–14.

The ground level houses a large bus terminus, Central (Exchange Square) Bus Terminus.

Tenants
The property is the home of the Stock Exchange of Hong Kong since the 1980s. It also houses many international banking and law firms including Bank of Montreal, Commonwealth Bank of Australia, Lloyd George Management, DLA Piper, Ropes & Gray, RPC, Latham & Watkins and Allen & Overy. Other major tenants include  Sixth Street Partners, Aberdeen Standard Investment, Angelo Gordon, Bluepool Capital, China Merchants Securities, CSOP, CQS, Evercore, Fanda Partners, Harvest Fund, Hillhouse Capital, Hopu Investment and Janchor Partners. Exchange Square is also home to the Hong Kong International Arbitration Centre, the American Club of Hong Kong, and the consulates in Hong Kong of Argentina, Canada, and Japan.

Plot
Hong Kong Land tendered the Government $4.76 billion for the plot in February 1982, when the market was at a record high. Prices subsequently dropped, necessitating its debt to be restructured. In February 1983, HKL obtained an eight-year loan of $4 billion, a record. In December 1983, it announced that the plot was to be mortgaged to secure a $2.5 billion loan facility. The second instalment of $2 billion on the plot was due in the financial year 1984/85.

Phase three
Development cost HK$750m, 32-storey  office tower,  mall, substructure contractor Gammon Hong Kong.

The Forum
The Forum was a shopping complex at the podium level. From 2011 to 2014 it was redeveloped into a seven-storey office building with a floor area of 4,460 sq m. It is wholly occupied by Standard Chartered Bank. The plaza outside the forum includes a landscaped roof garden, stepped terraces and fountains, and a collection of sculptures by artists such as Henry Moore, Ju Ming and Dame Elizabeth Frank.

Gallery

Nearby buildings
Jardine House
Chater House (formerly King's Building)
Mandarin Oriental (formerly Queen's Building)
Alexandra House
Prince's Building
The Landmark
Cheung Kong Center
HSBC Building
Standard Chartered Hong Kong
Three Garden Road
World-Wide House
Wheelock House
Hang Seng Bank Headquarters Building

See also
 List of buildings and structures in Hong Kong
 List of tallest buildings in Hong Kong

References

External links

Exchange Square

Skyscraper office buildings in Hong Kong
Central, Hong Kong
Hongkong Land
Office buildings completed in 1985
Twin towers
1985 establishments in Hong Kong